Kenneth Joseph Silvestri (May 3, 1916 – March 31, 1992) was an American professional baseball player, coach and manager. During his 16-year professional playing career, he was a backup catcher in the Major Leagues over eight seasons scattered between  through , appearing for the Chicago White Sox (1939–40), New York Yankees (1941; 1946–47) and Philadelphia Phillies (1950–51).

Silvestri was born in Chicago and attended Purdue University. He served in the United States Army during World War II.

As a big leaguer, Silvestri batted .217, with 44 hits, 11 doubles, one triple, five home runs and 25 RBI in 102 games played. As a member of the 1950 Phillies, he appeared in Game 2 of the 1950 World Series as a defensive replacement, spelling starting catcher Andy Seminick and handling Baseball Hall of Famer Robin Roberts for two scoreless innings.  However, the opposing Yankees broke through to win the game after Silvestri was removed for a pinch hitter in the ninth.

Following his MLB playing career, Silvestri managed in the minor leagues in the Yankee farm system and coached for the Phillies (1952–53; 1959–60), Milwaukee / Atlanta Braves (1963–75) and the White Sox (1976; 1982), working as a minor league instructor for Chicago from 1977 to 1981. He also managed the Atlanta Braves for the final three games of the  season after skipper Billy Hitchcock was fired. The Braves lost all three games Silvestri managed.
 
Silvestri died in Tallahassee, Florida at age 75.

References

Sources

BaseballLibrary
Encyclopedia of Baseball Catchers

1916 births
1992 deaths
United States Army personnel of World War II
Atlanta Braves coaches
Atlanta Braves managers
Baseball players from Chicago
Chicago White Sox coaches
Chicago White Sox players
Kansas City Blues (baseball) players
Major League Baseball bullpen coaches
Major League Baseball catchers
Major League Baseball pitching coaches
Milwaukee Braves coaches
Minor league baseball managers
New York Yankees players
Newark Bears (IL) players
Owensboro Oilers players
Philadelphia Phillies coaches
Philadelphia Phillies players
Purdue Boilermakers baseball players
Richmond Virginians (minor league) players
St. Paul Saints (AA) players
St. Petersburg Saints players
Sportspeople from Chicago
Winston-Salem Twins players